Substitutionism is a term in Marxist theory which refers to the relationship between the revolutionary party and the working class, which refers to the former's activity substituting the latter's. It is seen as an inverse to classical Marxism, which suggests the "emancipation of the working class must be the work of the working class itself". The term was coined by the Russian revolutionary, Leon Trotsky in 1904, as a warning against what he saw as a flaw inherent in Lenin's conception of the party.

See also
Castroism
Maoism
Permanent revolution
Stalinism
State capitalism
Two Stage Theory
Vanguardism

References

Further reading

Communist terminology
Political theories
Political parties
Trotskyism